Carniflora Australis was a biannual English-language periodical and the official publication of the Australasian Carnivorous Plant Society. Typical articles included matters of horticultural interest, field reports, and scientific studies.

The journal was established in March 2003. It published in full colour and totals around 64 pages annually. The last issue appeared in September 2014.

Taxon descriptions
Carniflora Australis published the formal description of Nepenthes bokorensis in its March 2009 issue and of Nepenthes leonardoi in the March 2011 issue.

References

External links
 

2003 establishments in Australia
2014 disestablishments in Australia
Biannual magazines published in Australia
Carnivorous plant magazines
Defunct magazines published in Australia
Magazines established in 2003
Magazines disestablished in 2014
Mass media in New South Wales